Christian Beldi (born in Bucharest in 1958) is a Romanian pianist. He is a professor at the Cologne University of Music.

References
  Robert Schumann Hochschule Düsseldorf
  University of Maryland, College Park - Clarice Smith Performing Arts Center
  Hochschule für Musik Köln
  Consulate of Germany in Timișoara
 
  Rencontres Musicales Internationales en Wallonie
  ArkivMusic
  Ensemble Modern

1958 births
Living people
Musicians from Bucharest
Romanian classical pianists
José Iturbi International Piano Competition prize-winners
21st-century classical pianists
Academic staff of the Hochschule für Musik und Tanz Köln